Ismael Costa Lekbab (born 8 May 1999), also known as simply Ismael, is a Portuguese professional footballer who plays for Varzim S.C. as a goalkeeper.

Club career
Lekbab was born to Moroccan parents in Póvoa de Varzim, and raised in the parish of Aver-o-Mar. He came through the ranks of his hometown club Varzim S.C. and made his senior debut with the reserve team in the Porto Football Association's first district league.

In May 2019, Lekbab was called up to the first team for the first time due to the suspension of Rafael Broetto, for the penultimate game of the LigaPro season away to  C.D. Cova da Piedade on 12 May. He played the game ahead of Emanuel Novo and kept a clean sheet in a goalless draw for the relegation-threatened side. Manager César Peixoto kept him in goal for the crucial final game at home to Académica de Coimbra, where he was again unbeaten in a 1–0 win that kept the team up.

On 29 August 2019, Lekbab signed a new contract to last until the end of the 2021–22 season.

References

External links

1999 births
Living people
People from Póvoa de Varzim
Portuguese people of Moroccan descent
Portuguese sportspeople of African descent
Sportspeople of Moroccan descent
Portuguese footballers
Association football goalkeepers
Liga Portugal 2 players
Varzim S.C. players
Sportspeople from Porto District